Parkweg is an underground subway station in the Dutch town of Schiedam, located just west of Rotterdam. The station is part of Rotterdam Metro line C and was opened as a result of an extension of the East-West Line (also formerly called Caland line) which opened in November 2002. This extension connected the former terminus Marconiplein to the North-South Line (also Erasmus line) at Tussenwater station.

Rotterdam Metro stations
Buildings and structures in Schiedam
Railway stations opened in 2002
2002 establishments in the Netherlands
Railway stations in the Netherlands opened in the 21st century